Luka Peruzović (born 26 February 1952) is a Croatian football coach and former player, who managed Belgium's Standard Liège, Charleroi and Anderlecht and Qatar's Al Sadd. He also holds a Belgian citizenship.

Club career
As a player, Peruzović played over 400 games for Hajduk Split in all competitions before following his former coach Tomislav Ivić to Anderlecht in 1980. Playing as centre-back or sweeper he helped them reach the 1982 European Cup semi-final and won the 1983 UEFA Cup Final against Benfica.

International career
Peruzović made his debut for Yugoslavia in a July 1974 World Cup Finals match against Sweden, coming on as a 78th-minute substitute for Miroslav Pavlović, and earned a total of 18 caps, scoring no goals. He also played for his country in the 1976 European championship. His final international was a December 1983 European championship qualification match against Bulgaria.

Managerial career
After retiring he worked as a coach in Croatia, Belgium, France and Turkey. In December 2004, he was appointed manager of Al Ittihad, but lasted only three months until March 2005. He then coached Bahrain national team in their 2006 World Cup qualifiers, losing out the playoff to Trinidad and Tobago. He was dismissed by the Bahraini FA in February 2006.

He was named as the manager of Tunisian team CS Sfax in 2009, before returning to Belgium to take charge of Charleroi, his fourth stint at the club.

Personal life
Peruzović is the younger brother of WWE wrestler Josip Peruzović, better known as Nikolai Volkoff, who died on 29 July 2018, after having been in a hospital in Maryland where he had been treated for dehydration and other issues.

Honours

Player 
Hajduk Split
 Yugoslav First League: 1970–71, 1973–74, 1974–75, 1978–79
 Yugoslav Cup: 1971–72, 1973, 1974, 1975–76, 1976–77, 1986–87

Anderlecht
 Belgian First Division: 1980–81, 1984–85, 1985–86
 Belgian Supercup: 1985
 UEFA Cup: 1982–83; runner-up 1983–84
 Jules Pappaert Cup: 1983, 1985
 Bruges Matins: 1985

Manager 
Anderlecht
 Belgian First Division: 1992–93

Marseille
 Ligue 2: 1994–95

Al-Sadd
 Qatar Stars League: 2003–04
 Qatar Cup: 2003

CS Sfaxien
 Ligue 2: 1994–95
 North African Cup Winners Cup: 2009

Charleroi

 Belgian Second Division: 2011–12

References

External links
 
 
 Career stats
 coaching career

1952 births
Living people
Footballers from Split, Croatia
Yugoslav footballers
Association football central defenders
Yugoslavia international footballers
1974 FIFA World Cup players
UEFA Euro 1976 players
HNK Hajduk Split players
R.S.C. Anderlecht players
Yugoslav First League players
Belgian Pro League players
UEFA Cup winning players
Yugoslav football managers
Croatian football managers
HNK Hajduk Split managers
R. Charleroi S.C. managers
R.S.C. Anderlecht managers
K.R.C. Genk managers
Olympique de Marseille managers
Gençlerbirliği S.K. managers
Standard Liège managers
Al Sadd SC managers
Ittihad FC managers
Bahrain national football team managers
Al-Shaab CSC managers
CS Sfaxien managers
Yugoslav expatriate footballers
Yugoslav expatriate sportspeople in Belgium
Expatriate footballers in Belgium
Croatian expatriate football managers
Croatian expatriate sportspeople in Belgium
Expatriate football managers in Belgium
Croatian expatriate sportspeople in France
Expatriate football managers in France
Croatian expatriate sportspeople in Turkey
Expatriate football managers in Turkey
Croatian expatriate sportspeople in Qatar
Expatriate football managers in Qatar
Croatian expatriate sportspeople in Saudi Arabia
Expatriate football managers in Saudi Arabia
Croatian expatriate sportspeople in Bahrain
Expatriate football managers in Bahrain
Croatian expatriate sportspeople in the United Arab Emirates
Expatriate football managers in the United Arab Emirates
Croatian expatriate sportspeople in Tunisia
Expatriate football managers in Tunisia